Elia David Cmíral (born October 1, 1950) is a Czech composer for film, television, ballet, and video games. He has worked on numerous projects across multiple genres, though he is arguably best known for his work in the thriller and horror cinema, and has collaborated with filmmakers like Wes Craven, John Frankenheimer, John Travolta, and Ernest Dickerson.

Early life and career 
Cmíral was born in Czechoslovakia, to an actress and a stage director, and was the grandson of one of Antonín Dvořák's pupils. Cmiral attended the Prague Conservatory, where he studied composition and double bass. His first scoring opportunity came with his father's production of Cyrano de Bergerac. He emigrated to Sweden, where he composed for a number of European films, television shows, and stage productions. In 1987 he moved to the United States, where he attended the University of Southern California and scored for an independent film entitled Apartment Zero.

As a composer, he is best known for his work in the horror and thriller film genres, with notable examples including Ronin, Bones, Stigmata, They, Wrong Turn, Pulse and Piranha 3DD. He also composed for the television series Nash Bridges and the first and third entries in the Atlas Shrugged film series, an adaptation of the best-selling Ayn Rand novel of the same name. He also composed and the award-winning adventure game The Last Express and the third-person shooter Spec Ops: The Line. As well as working in Hollywood, he has also composed numerous scores for films made in Sweden and the Czech Republic.

Personal life 
Cmíral currently resides in Sherman Oaks, Los Angeles.

Filmography

Feature films 
2016 - Doubles
2015 - Any Day
2014 - Atlas Shrugged Part III: Who Is John Galt?
2014 - Cam2Cam
2012 - Piranha 3DD
2012 - Rites of Passage
2011 - Atlas Shrugged: Part I
2010 - Lost Boys: The Thirst (video)
2010 - Habermann
2010 - The Killing Jar
2009 - Forget Me Not
2008 - Pulse 3 (video)
2008 - Splinter
2008 - Pulse 2: Afterlife (video)
2007 - Missionary Man
2007 - Tooth and Nail
2007 - The Deaths of Ian Stone
2006 - Pulse
2006 - Journey to the End of the Night
2005 - The Cutter (video)
2005 - The Mechanik
2005 - Iowa
2003 - Wrong Turn 
2002 - They
2001 - Bones
2000 - Battlefield Earth
1999 - Stigmata
1999 - The Wishing Tree
1998 - Ronin
1996 - Somebody Is Waiting
1995 - The Way Through Hell
1993 - (Sökarna)
1988 - Apartment Zero
1988 - En hundsaga
1986 - A Matter of Life and Death

Other 
 2017 - Lacrimosa (short)
 2010 - Call Me Bill (short)
 2003 - Son of Satan
 2003 - Eliza Dushku: Babe in the Woods (video documentary short)
 2003 - Fresh Meat: The Wounds of 'Wrong Turn''' (video documentary short)
 2003 - Stan Winston: Monster Mogul (video documentary short)
 2002 - Diggin' Up 'Bones' (video short)
 1999 - The Decadent Visitor (short)
 1998 - Prophecies (documentary)
 1998 - Visions of America (documentary)
 1997 - Babies for Babies (documentary)
 1997 - Sunsets by Candlelight (documentary)
 1988 - Alfred Jarry - Superfreak (short)

Television

2007 - While the Children Sleep (TV movie)
2006 - Blackbeard (TV movie)
2005 - The Reading Room (TV movie)
2004 - Species III (TV movie)
2002 - The Rats (TV movie)
1996 - Nash Bridges (TV series; Season 1, and first theme)
1993 - Macklean (TV mini-series)
1991 - Rosenholm (TV series)
1991 - Barnens Detektivbyrå (TV movie)
1991 - Kopplingen (TV movie)
1989 - Flickan vid stenbänken (TV series)

Video games
 2012 - Spec Ops: The Line 1997 - The Last Express''

References

External links
 
 
 Soundtrack Collector: Composer Details: Elia Cmiral

Living people
1950 births
University of Southern California alumni
Czechoslovak emigrants to Sweden
Swedish emigrants to the United States
American film score composers
American male film score composers
Varèse Sarabande Records artists
La-La Land Records artists